The 2023 Arlington Renegades season is the second season for the Arlington Renegades as a professional American football franchise. They are charter members of the XFL, one of eight teams to compete in the league for the 2023 season. The Renegades play their home games at the Choctaw Stadium and are led by head coach Bob Stoops.

The Renegades had changed their franchise name from Dallas Renegades to Arlington Renegades prior to the 2023 season.

Schedule
All times Central

Game summaries

Week 1: vs. Vegas Vipers

Week 2: at Houston Roughnecks

Week 3: vs. Orlando Guardians

Week 4: at St. Louis BattleHawks

Week 5: at San Antonio Brahmas

Week 6: vs. San Antonio Brahmas

Standings

Staff

Roster

References

Arlington
Arlington Renegades
Arlington Renegades